In mathematics, a unit circle is a circle of unit radius—that is, a radius of 1.  Frequently, especially in trigonometry, the unit circle is the circle of radius 1 centered at the origin (0, 0) in the Cartesian coordinate system in the Euclidean plane. In topology, it is often denoted as  because it is a one-dimensional unit -sphere.

Thus, by the Pythagorean theorem,  and  satisfy the equation

Since  for all , and since the reflection of any point on the unit circle about the - or -axis is also on the unit circle, the above equation holds for all points  on the unit circle, not only those in the first quadrant.

The interior of the unit circle is called the open unit disk, while the interior of the unit circle combined with the unit circle itself is called the closed unit disk.

One may also use other notions of "distance" to define other "unit circles", such as the Riemannian circle; see the article on mathematical norms for additional examples.

In the complex plane

In the complex plane, numbers of unit magnitude are called the unit complex numbers. This is the set of complex numbers  such that  When broken into real and imaginary components  this condition is 

The complex unit circle can be parametrized by angle measure  from the positive real axis using the complex exponential function,  (See Euler's formula.)

Under the complex multiplication operation, the unit complex numbers are group called the circle group, usually denoted  In quantum mechanics, a unit complex number is called a phase factor.

Trigonometric functions on the unit circle

The trigonometric functions cosine and sine of angle  may be defined on the unit circle as follows: If  is a point on the unit circle, and if the ray from the origin  to  makes an angle  from the positive -axis, (where counterclockwise turning is positive), then

The equation  gives the relation

The unit circle also demonstrates that sine and cosine are periodic functions, with the identities

for any integer .

Triangles constructed on the unit circle can also be used to illustrate the periodicity of the trigonometric functions. Now consider a point  and line segments . Having established these equivalences, take another radius  from the origin to a point   on the circle such that the same angle  is formed with the negative arm of the -axis. Now consider a point  and line segments . A simple demonstration of the above can be seen in the equality .

However, when defined with the unit circle, these functions produce meaningful values for any real-valued angle measure – even those greater than 2. In fact, all six standard trigonometric functions – sine, cosine, tangent, cotangent, secant, and cosecant, as well as archaic functions like versine and exsecant – can be defined geometrically in terms of a unit circle, as shown at right.

Using the unit circle, the values of any trigonometric function for many angles other than those labeled can be easily calculated by hand using the angle sum and difference formulas.

Complex dynamics

The Julia set of discrete nonlinear dynamical system with evolution function:

is a unit circle. It is a simplest case so it is widely used in the study of dynamical systems.

See also

Angle measure
Pythagorean trigonometric identity
Riemannian circle
Radian
Unit disk
Unit sphere
Unit hyperbola
Unit square
Turn (angle)
z-transform

Notes

References

Circles
1 (number)
Trigonometry
Fourier analysis
Analytic geometry